Church of the Transfiguration or Holy Transfiguration Church may refer to any of the following:

Albania 
 Holy Transfiguration Church, Gjirokastër
 Church of the Holy Transfiguration, Herebel, Dibër County

Belarus 
 Transfiguration Church, Navahrudak, Grodno Region (Roman Catholic)
 Transfiguration Church, Polotsk, Vitebsk Region

Croatia 
 Church of the Transfiguration of the Lord, Trpinja, Vukovar-Srijem County (Serbian Orthodox)

Estonia 
 The Obinitsa Church of Transfiguration of Our Lord, Meremäe Parish

Hungary 
 Transfiguration Church, Szentendre, Pest County (Serbian Orthodox)

Lithuania 
 Holy Transfiguration Church, Kėdainiai, Kaunas County

Italy 
 Trasfigurazione di Nostro Signore Gesù Cristo, Rome

Israel 
 Catholic Church of the Transfiguration on Mount Tabor
 Orthodox Church of the Transfiguration on Mount Tabor

Malta 
 Church of the Transfiguration, Qrendi

Moldova 
 Transfiguration Church, Chișinău

Palestine 
 Church of Transfiguration, Ramallah

Romania
 Transfiguration Church, Hunedoara

Russia 
 Church of the Transfiguration on Ilyina Street, Veliky Novgorod, Novgorod Oblast
 Church of the Transfiguration in Kizhi, Republic of Karelia, a World Heritage Site
 Transfiguration Church in Kovalyovo, Novgorod Oblast
 Transfiguration Church, Krasnoyarsk (Roman Catholic)
 Transfiguration Church, Pyatigorsk, Stavropol Krai (Roman Catholic)
 Church of the Transfiguration (Obukhovka), Rostov Oblast
 Church of the Transfiguration (Olkhovchik), Rostov Oblast
 Church of the Transfiguration (Spassky), Tula Oblast
 Transfiguration Church, Starocherkasskaya, Rostov Oblast
 Transfiguration of the Lord Church, Tver
 Church of the Transfiguration (Zaymo-Obryv), Rostov Oblast

Serbia 
 Church of the Holy Transfiguration, Sarajevo
 Church of the Transfiguration, Krivaja, Šabac

Turkmenistan 
 Chapel of the Transfiguration, Ashgabat (Roman Catholic)

Ukraine 
 Church of Transfiguration, Lviv

United Kingdom 
 Church of the Transfiguration, Pyecombe, West Sussex

United States 
Alaska
 Holy Transfiguration of Our Lord Chapel in Ninilchik
 Transfiguration of Our Lord Chapel in Nushagak

Arkansas
 Holy Transfiguration Orthodox Church in Mountain Home

California
 Church of the Transfiguration in San Jose (Roman Catholic)

Connecticut
 Church of the Transfiguration in Norfolk (Episcopal)

Illinois
 Church of the Transfiguration in Palos Park (Episcopal)
 Church of the Transfiguration in Wauconda (Roman Catholic)

Maryland
 Transfiguration of our Lord Russian Orthodox Church in Baltimore

Massachusetts
 Church of the Transfiguration in Orleans (Ecumenical; Roman-style basilica)

Minnesota
 Episcopal Church of the Transfiguration (Belle Plaine, Minnesota)

New Hampshire
 Church of the Transfiguration in Derry, New Hampshire (Episcopal)

New Jersey
 Church of the Transfiguration in Collingswood (Roman Catholic)

New York
 Church of the Transfiguration, Episcopal (Manhattan), also known as the Little Church Around the Corner, the first church to be named for the Transfiguration in the United States
 Church of the Transfiguration, Roman Catholic (Manhattan) on Mott Street in Chinatown, Manhattan (originally Zion Episcopal Protestant Church; now Roman Catholic)
 Church of the Transfiguration in Tarrytown (Roman Catholic)
 Church of the Transfiguration in Buffalo (Roman Catholic; closed in 1993)
 Church of the Transfiguration in Maspeth (Roman Catholic)
 Church of the Holy Transfiguration of Christ-on-the-Mount in Woodstock
 Church of the Transfiguration (Blue Mountain Lake, New York)
 Russian Orthodox Cathedral of the Transfiguration of Our Lord in Brooklyn

North Carolina
 Church of the Transfiguration (Saluda, North Carolina)

Ohio
 Transfiguration Church (Cleveland, Ohio) (Roman Catholic)

Pennsylvania
 Church of the Transfiguration in Blue Ridge Summit (Episcopal)
 Transfiguration Church in West Hazleton (Roman Catholic)

Texas
 Church of the Transfiguration in Dallas (Episcopal)

Washington
 Church of Transfiguration in Tacoma (Russian Evangelical Baptist)

Wyoming
 Chapel of the Transfiguration in Grand Teton National Park, near Jackson (Episcopal)

See also 
 Transfiguration Cathedral (disambiguation)